The Sanmin Park is a park in Songshan District, Taipei, Taiwan.

History
The park was opened in 1973.

Architecture
The park covers an area of 26,820 m2. The park features children's playground, skating rink, jungle gyms, pavilions, badminton courts and workout trails.

Transportation
The park is accessible east from Songshan Airport Station of Taipei Metro.

See also
 List of parks in Taiwan

References

External link

1973 establishments in Taiwan
Parks established in 1973
Parks in Taipei